Bay Fair station is a Bay Area Rapid Transit (BART) station located adjacent to the Bayfair Center mall in San Leandro, California. The station opened on September 11, 1972. It became a transfer station on May 10, 1997, with the opening of the branch to Dublin/Pleasanton; a flying junction was built south of the station.

Bay Fair station has a single elevated island platform serving the line's two tracks. A pedestrian tunnel under the Union Pacific Railroad Oakland Subdivision tracks connects the fare lobby to parking areas south of the station. An AC Transit bus transfer area and additional parking are located on the north side of the station.

References

External links 

BART - Bay Fair

Bay Area Rapid Transit stations in Alameda County, California
Stations on the Orange Line (BART)
Stations on the Green Line (BART)
Stations on the Blue Line (BART)
Railway stations in the United States opened in 1972
Buildings and structures in San Leandro, California